Song for Marion is a 2012 British-German comedy-drama film written and directed by Paul Andrew Williams and starring Terence Stamp, Gemma Arterton, Christopher Eccleston and Vanessa Redgrave. The film was released as Unfinished Song in the United States.

The film was nominated for three awards—Best Actor, Best Screenplay, and Best Supporting Actress—at the 2012 British Independent Film Awards.

Plot
Arthur Harris is the grumpy husband of Marion, who is terminally ill yet continues to participate with enthusiasm at her local seniors' choir, The OAP'Z. The choirmaster is a young teacher, Elizabeth who is preparing the choir to enter a local musical choir competition called "Shadow Song". Arthur is also estranged from his son, James. Marion's health deteriorates over time until one night when she dies in her sleep. Arthur initially takes this loss severely and cuts himself from his family and the choir. Eventually he agrees to take Marion's place in the choir. The transition proves to be a challenge for Arthur thanks to the unconventional songbook that includes racier songs such as Salt-N-Pepa's "Let's Talk About Sex" and Motörhead's "Ace of Spades". However he grows to enjoy spending time in the choir.

On the eve of the competition, Arthur has an argument with James in a failed attempt to rebuild their relationship and pulls out of the choir. The choir participates in the competition without Arthur. He arrives later but before he can perform with the choir, they are eliminated from the competition by the judges. The choir are on their way to return home in defeat when Arthur stops the bus and storms the musical competition's stage shortly joined by the rest of the choir. They perform again with Arthur singing a solo of "Lullabye (Goodnight, My Angel)". The choir finishes in third place and returns home triumphant. Arthur and his son, James (who watched him perform in the competition) reconnect on the journey home with James leaving an answering phone message confirming this later.

Cast

Soundtrack
The film is accompanied by a song titled "Unfinished Songs" written by Diane Warren and performed by Celine Dion. The song was included in Dion's 2013 album Loved Me Back to Life but with different vocal and musical arrangements.

The song "Lullabye (Goodnight, My Angel)", performed by the main character in the film, is a Billy Joel song.

The score was composed by Laura Rossi. Lost In The Multiplex's Soundtrek section deemed Rossi's score "lovely", but opined that the OAP'Z songs "aren't particularly funny, they're not that fun to listen to either."

Reception
On review aggregator Rotten Tomatoes, the film holds an approval rating of 65% based on 100 reviews, with an average rating of 5.91/10. The website's critics consensus reads: "It's unabashedly sentimental, but thanks to reliably powerful performances from a well-rounded veteran cast, Unfinished Song proves a sweetly compelling character piece." On Metacritic, the film has a weighted average score of 57 out of 100, based on 25 critics, indicating "mixed or average reviews".

Production
Although the film is set in London it was primarily shot on location in Newcastle upon Tyne and Durham. Filming took place over some six weeks in July and August 2011, and locations included St Francis Community Centre (next to Freeman Hospital), Newcastle City Hall, Mill Volvo Tyne Theatre, Chester-le-Street Cemetery and Durham Johnston Comprehensive School.

The 2007 documentary film Young@Heart also deals with a choir of seniors performing contemporary music.

References

External links
 
 
 
 

2012 comedy-drama films
2012 films
British comedy-drama films
British independent films
English-language German films
Films set in London
Films shot in England
German comedy-drama films
2012 independent films
German independent films
Films about old age
2010s English-language films
2010s British films
2010s German films